Viceroy Research LLC is an international investigative financial research group registered in Delaware, United States. It was founded by a British short-seller Fraser John Perring together with Australian partners Aiden Lau and Gabriel Bernarde in 2016. Perring and Viceroy have stirred considerable media interested because of their reports on firms like Wirecard which they accused of nonexisting accounts. Of late, Viceroy has been known to bet against companies like Tesla, or Grenke.

In 2021, the South African Financial Sector Conduct Authority (FSCA) has fined  Viceroy R50 million for damaging remarks that the short-selling firm made about South Africa's Capitec Bank.

In October 2021, it issued a damning report against Adler Real Estate for inflated valuations and undisclosed related party deals.  KPMG probed the allegations and cleared the company of systemic fraud, but was unable to refute all of the claims. KPMG quit in May 2022. Adler eventually was unable to repay its debt and is negotiating to restructure it.

External links
Viceroy Research website

References

Short selling
Valuation (finance)